Nicholas John Haste (born 13 November 1972) is an English former first-class cricketer.

Haste was born at Northampton in November 1972. He was educated at Wellingborough School, before going up to Pembroke College, Cambridge. While studying at Cambridge, he played first-class cricket for Cambridge University Cricket Club between 1993 and 1996, making 32 appearances. Playing as a medium pace bowler in the Cambridge side, Haste took 49 wickets at an average of 60.26. He took one five wicket haul, with figures of 5 for 73 against Oxford University in the 1995 University Match at Lord's. His bowling action in the match was described by Norman Harris of The Independent as having a "purposeful stride and vigorous action" and that "he looked a genuinely first-class bowler". As a lower order batsman, he scored 372 runs at a batting average of 13.28 from his 32 matches; he made one half century, a score of 51 against Oxford University in 1996. After graduating from Cambridge, Haste did not proceed further in the first-class game. He did however play club cricket for Brentwood Cricket Club in Essex, and Bedford Town in the Northamptonshire Cricket League.

References

External links

1972 births
Living people
Cricketers from Northampton
People educated at Wellingborough School
Alumni of Pembroke College, Cambridge
English cricketers
Cambridge University cricketers